Olivera Katarina (born 5 March 1940), also previously known as Olivera Vučo and Olivera Šakić, is a Serbian actress, singer and writer. She was one of the leading stars of Yugoslav cinema in the 1960s and the 1970s, and is probably the best known for her performance in Aleksandar Petrović's film I Even Met Happy Gypsies (1967), which won the Grand Prix at the 1967 Cannes Film Festival.

As a singer, Olivera Katarina has performed music of various genres, varying from Serbian traditional to pop music, and in numerous languages. Her version of "Đelem, đelem", which she performed in I Even Met Happy Gypsies, has been considered one of the best renditions of that song ever recorded.

Early life 
Olivera Katarina was born Olivera Petrović to father Budimir, a naval captain, and mother Katarina (née Jovančić) on 5 March 1940 in Belgrade, Kingdom of Yugoslavia. She adopted Olivera Katarina in 1969 to honor her mother, who had died on 4 January 1969. She spent her childhood in Belgrade, Dobanovci and Valjevo.

As a child, Olivera Katarina attended piano and ballet lessons. In 1959, she went to Paris and enrolled the Alliance Française school in order to improve her French language skills. Olivera Katarina initially enrolled the University of Belgrade Faculty of Law before switching to the Faculty of Dramatic Arts. Among her mates at the Faculty of Dramatic Arts were Milena Dravić and Petar Kralj.

Career 
She studied at the academy for theater, film, radio and television in Belgrade. Started her career as a student with a major role as Koštana in a same name play in a National Theater in Belgrade. There she met Vuk Vučo, a theater critic whom she later married.

For a role in Goya or the Hard Way to Enlightenment in 1971 (as Olivera Katarina), she was awarded at festivals in Moscow and Venice. Her major success was in Aleksandar Petrović's I Even Met Happy Gypsies, where she played a gipsy singer named Lenče. Film was nominated for the Best Foreign Language Film at the  40th Academy Awards, for a Palme d'Or at the 1967 Cannes Film Festival, and for Best Foreign-Language film at the 26th Golden Globe Awards. It won the FIPRESCI Grand Prize of the Jury at the 1967 Cannes Film Festival. Olivera closed this festival with a concert together with Nana Mouskouri and Dionne Warwick.

She also had a very prominent singing career. She recorded in Serbian language, as well as in Russian, Japanese, Romanian, Greek, Romani, and Indonesian. She sang traditional Serbian folk songs and Gypsy/Romani songs. In famous Paris Olympia she held 72 consecutive concerts.

In 1969, she participated in the national choice to represent Yugoslavia in the Eurovision Song Contest 1969 with the song "Poigraj, poigraj, devojče".

Olivera Katarina is also known as "the only woman Salvador Dalí knelt in front of", being amazed by her beauty and voice, after her concert in Paris.

In 2007, Katarina contributed songs for Marina Abramović's Balkan Erotic Epic, and portrays a goddess in Uroš Stojanović's film Čarlston za Ognjenku.

Personal life 
In her early youth Olivera Katarina dated water polo goalkeeper Milan Muškatirović for several years during the late 1950s.

During her time at the film academy she met journalist Vuk Vučo and quickly married him. The marriage lasted only a year and a half.

She then for seven years lived in a common-law relationship with the powerful Yugoslav Security Service (UDBA) operative and Avala Film chairman Ratko Dražević.

In 1970, Olivera Katarina married Miladin Šakić, an administrator who later became the president of the Red Star Belgrade football club, with then Mayor of Belgrade Branko Pešić as Šakić's best man. The couple's only son Mane, a painter based in Madrid, was born on 1 February 1971. Later in 1971, Šakić died in a car accident near Mladenovac. In an interview for the Blic daily in 2011, Olivera Katarina claimed she had not been in a relationship with a man after Šakić.

Filmography

Discography

Studio albums 
 Olivera Katarina (1974)
 Alaj mi je večeras po volji (1974)
 O. K. (U ime ljubavi) (1976)
 Ciganske pesme (1977)
 Osvetnica (1979)
 Zarudela zora na Moravi (1980)
 Idu momci u vojnike (1982)
 Retka zverka (1984)
 Romanija/Pleme moje... (1999)
 Tajna (2009)

Compilation albums 
 Alaj mi je večeras po volji – Najlepše pesme (1999)

Singles 
 "Nije to, ljudi, istina" / "Šošana" / "'Ajde da igramo" / "Ne dam, ne dam" (1966)
 "Ja ništa ne znam" / "Bosonoga Sendi (Marioneta)" / "Moj je ceo svet (Uno Tranquillo)" / "A Man and a Woman Theme Song" (1967)
 "Neću tebe (Doksa to teo)" / "Suliram" / "Svu noć je padao sneg" / "Jer ljubav to je miris belog cveća" (1967)
 "Đelem, đelem" / "Rino" / "Trajo, trajo" / "Bida" / "Niška Banja" / "Čerde Mile" (1967)
 "Balade" (1968)
 "Poigraj, poigraj, devojče" (1969)
 "Himna čoveku" (1969)
 "Šu, šu" / "Tula" / "Baš sam srećna ja (La felicidad)" / "Eri (Irene Erini)" (1969)
 "Ža, ža" / "Lidu, lidu" / "Verka kaluđerka" / "Kaljina, maljina" (1969)
 "To je naše more, to su naše gore..." (1971)
 "Vatra" / "Ljubav" (1971)
 "Budi moj" / "Imam nešto da ti dam" (1971)
 "Tam deka ima" / "Dimitrijo" (1971)
 "Treperi jedno veče" / "Htela bih da znam" (1972)
 "Wakamono ha kaeranakatta" / "Koi ha..." (1973)
 "Alba" / "Plovi lađa Dunavom" (1973)
 "Ne dodiruj moje lice" / "Ne reci nikom" (1974)
 "Pričaj mi o ljubavi" / "Pada noć" (1974)
 "Alaj mi je večeras po volji" / "Kamerav" / "Čep, čep u slavinu" / "Verka kaluđerka" (1975)
 "Žena" / "Sada i nikada više" (1975)
 "Sanjam" / "Bilo je tako lepo sve" (1976)
 "Crvena jabuka" / "Sijerinska banja" (1977)
 "Nikad ne zaboravi dane naše ljubavi" / "Slatke male laži" (1979)

Bibliography 
 Beli badnjaci (White Yules)
 Aristokratsko stopalo (Aristocratic Foot)

References

External links 
 

1940 births
Eastern Orthodox Christians from Serbia
Living people
Singers from Belgrade
Actresses from Belgrade
20th-century Serbian women singers
Serbian film actresses
Serbian folk singers
Serbian non-fiction writers
Serbian women poets
Serbian stage actresses
Serbian television actresses
Serbian women writers
Serbian writers
University of Belgrade alumni
University of Belgrade Faculty of Dramatic Arts alumni
University of Belgrade Faculty of Law alumni
Yugoslav actresses
Yugoslav women singers
20th-century Serbian actresses
21st-century Serbian actresses